State Highway  31 is a state highway in the Indian state of Andhra Pradesh which connects Renigunta and Muddanur in the state. It is the longest known state highway in Kadapa and Chittoor districts collectively.

Route

It starts at Renigunta From there it passes through the Kadapa city, and ends in Muddanur. It spans over a distance of about 189 km.

The route is as following: 

Renigunta→Rajampet→Vontimitta→Kadapa→Yerraguntla→Muddanur

See also
 List of State Highways in Andhra Pradesh

References

State Highways in Andhra Pradesh
Roads in Kadapa district
Roads in Chittoor district
Transport in Tirupati